Charlie Chop-off is the pseudonym given to an unidentified American serial killer known to have killed three black children and one Puerto Rican child in Manhattan between 1972 and 1973. This assailant is also known to have attempted to murder one other child.

All the victims of this assailant were male, and the majority of murders committed by this individual involved the genital mutilation or attempted genital mutilation of the victims.

While the case is still considered an open one, Erno Soto was held as a suspect and confessed to one of the murders, but was considered unfit for trial and sent back to a mental institution.

Murders 

On March 9, 1972, eight-year-old Douglas Owens was found dead, stabbed 38 times. His penis had been cut, but not severed from his body. On April 20, another black youth was repeatedly stabbed; his genitals were severed from his body, although he survived his injuries. On October 23, nine-year-old Wendell Hubbard was stabbed to death on the roof of an East Harlem tenement block. His penis had also been severed from his body.

On March 6, 1973, a nine-year-old Puerto Rican child named Luis Ortiz was stabbed 38 times and likewise mutilated. Finally, on August 17, 1973, eight-year-old Steven Cropper was repeatedly slashed with a razor on the roof of a tenement block. He bled to death from an injury to his arm, although his penis was left intact.

Erno Soto
After the botched abduction of a Puerto Rican boy on May 15, 1974, Erno Soto was arrested by the police. He was an intermittent patient of the Manhattan State Hospital since 1969 and confessed to the 1973 slaying of Cropper. His only surviving victim did say that Soto looked like his attacker, but refused to positively identify him. Manhattan State Hospital officials stated Soto was in their custody at the time of the murder, but also later confirmed that he might have eluded confinement, as it had happened before.

Despite lack of evidence, investigators still believe that he is a likely suspect, citing the fact that the murders ceased after his arrest, and that an anonymous source placed him as a potential culprit on the first killing. However, due to his acute mental instability, he is unlikely to stand trial.

Miguel Rivera
In 1975, Barbara Gelb published On the Track of Murder and used Miguel Rivera as a pseudonym for Soto. Since then, numerous authors, such as Peter Vronsky or Lane and Gregg, have erroneously cited the name as being that of the killer.

See also 
 List of fugitives from justice who disappeared
 List of serial killers in the United States

References

Cited works and further reading

External links
SOTO Erno aka Charlie Chopoff at the True Crime Library

1972 in New York City
1972 murders in the United States
American murderers of children
American serial killers
Murder in New York City
Unidentified serial killers
Violence against men in North America